Giulio Chiesa (23 April 1928 – 13 July 2010) was an Italian pole vaulter who competed in the 1956 Summer Olympics.

Biography
He has 19 caps in national team from 1950 to 1960. Became General of the Guardia di Finanza, Giulio Chiesa has died at the age of 82 years.

Olympic results

National records
 Pole vault: 4.35 m ( Rome, 7 October 1956)

References

External links
 

1928 births
2010 deaths
Italian male pole vaulters
Olympic athletes of Italy
Athletes (track and field) at the 1956 Summer Olympics
Mediterranean Games gold medalists for Italy
Athletes (track and field) at the 1955 Mediterranean Games
Mediterranean Games medalists in athletics